Jaco van Tonder (born 7 April 1991) is a South African rugby union player, currently playing with Top10 side Colorno. His regular position is full-back, winger or fly-half.

Career

Youth
He represented George-based side  at the 2007 Under-16 Grant Khomo Week, as well as at the 2008 and 2009 Under-18 Craven Week tournaments. He was also included in an Under-18 Elite Squad in 2008.

He joined the  academy in 2010 and made 40 appearances for their Under-19 and Under-21 teams between 2010 and 2012.

Sharks
He was included in the  squad for the 2011 Vodacom Cup competition, but failed to make an appearance.

Sharks
He was released by the Sharks in November 2015.

References

South African rugby union players
Living people
Rugby union players from Cape Town
1991 births
Sharks (Currie Cup) players
Sharks (rugby union) players
Rugby union fullbacks
Rugby union wings
Afrikaner people
South African people of Danish descent
Southern Kings players
Rugby Colorno players